Sayansky District is an administrative and municipal district (raion), one of the forty-three in Krasnoyarsk Krai, Russia. It is located in the southeast of the krai and borders Rybinsky District in the north, Irbeysky District in the east, Irkutsk Oblast in the southeast, Kuraginsky District in the south, and Partizansky District in the west. Its administrative center is the rural locality (a selo) of Aginskoye. As of the 2010 Census, the total population of the district was 12,002, with the population of Aginskoye accounting for 46.5% of that number.

History
The district was founded on April 4, 1924.

Government
As of 2017, the Head of the district is Igor V. Danilin.

References

Notes

Sources

Districts of Krasnoyarsk Krai
States and territories established in 1924